The Utah Catzz was a team in the United States Professional Indoor Football League (PIFL) in 1998. The Catzz franchise was owned by Michael & Carla Curran, who also started a farm club for the Catzz, the Salt Lake Lions (semi-pro football team). The Catzz played their home games at the David O. McKay Events Center in Orem, UT., with the team office located in Salt Lake City, UT. The team's color's were: Blue, Red, and Purple. Utah's head coach for the 1998 season was Gordon Hudson. 

The Catzz played four preseason PIFL games in 1997-98. Winning three out of the four:

December 6, 1997 - Utah Catzz 41 at West Virginia Wizards 51†
December 20, 1997 - Texas Bullets 22 at Utah Catzz 47
March 21, 1998 - Tucson Mirage† 23 at Utah Catzz 59
April 4, 1998 - Utah Catzz 42 at Louisiana Bayou Beast 40

† was scheduled to be an expansion team for the 1999 season.

Season-By-Season

|-
|1998 || 5 || 9 || 0 || 6th League || --

Utah Catzz 1998 schedule

April 11 - Minnesota Monsters 30, at Utah Catzz 32
April 18 - Texas Bullets 24, at Utah Catzz 57
April 26 - Utah Catzz 27, at Colorado Wildcats 29
May 9 - Madison Mad Dogs 49, at Utah Catzz 27
May 16 - Louisiana Bayou Beast 44, at Utah Catzz 14
May 23 - Colorado Wildcats 43, at Utah Catzz 26
May 30 - Utah Catzz at Minnesota Monsters - Minnesota forfeits
June 6 - Utah Catzz 37, at Green Bay Bombers 47
June 20 - Utah Catzz 16, at Louisiana Bayou Beast 43
June 27 - Honolulu Hurricanes 50, at Utah Catzz 52
July 4 - Green Bay Bombers 61, at Utah Catzz 43
July 18 - Utah Catzz at Texas Bullets - Texas forfeits 
July 25 - Utah Catzz 12, at Honolulu Hurricanes 42
August 1 - Utah Catzz at Madison Mad Dogs - Utah forfeits

References

Professional Indoor Football League teams
American football teams in Utah
Sports in Orem, Utah
American football teams established in 1998
American football teams disestablished in 1998
1998 establishments in Utah
1998 disestablishments in Utah